Salpingidae or  narrow-waisted bark beetles is a family of beetles in the superfamily Tenebrionoidea. The species are small, about 1.5 – 7 mm in length. The family is globally distributed and consists of about 45 genera and 300 species, which are generally found in the temperate regions of both hemispheres. The family is mainly associated with plants (both living and dead) as well as with ascomycete and hyphomycete fungi. Some members of the family are associated with unusual habitats, like Aegialites and Antarcticodomus, which are found in coastal areas including the intertidal zone, with former feeding on algae.

Genera
These 28 genera belong to the family Salpingidae:

 Aegialites Mannerheim, 1853
 Aglenus Erichson, 1845
 Antarcticodomus Brookes, 1951
 Aprostomis Grouvelle, 1913
 Cariderus Mulsant, 1859
 Colposis Mulsant, 1859
 Dacoderus LeConte, 1858
 Elacatis Pascoe, 1860 (false tiger beetles)
 Episcapha Dejean, 1833
 Inopeplus Smith, 1851
 Istrisia Lewis, 1895
 Lissodema Curtis, 1833
 Myrmecoderus Aalbu, Andrews & Pollock, 2005
 Ocholissa Pascoe, 1863
 Parelacatis Chapin, 1923
 Poophylax Champion, 1916
 Rabocerus Mulsant, 1859
 Rhinosimus Latreille, 1805
 Salpingus Illiger, 1801
 Serrotibia Reitter, 1877
 Sosthenes Champion, 1889
 Sphaeriestes Stephens, 1831
 Szekessya Kaszab, 1955
 Tretothorax Lea, 1911-01
 Trogocryptoides Champion, 1924
 Vincenzellus Reitter, 1911
 † Arra Peris et al. 2014 Spanish amber, Albian
 † Eopeplus Kirejtshuk & Nel, 2009 Oise amber, France, Ypresian
 † Protolissodema Alekseev, 2013 Baltic amber, Eocene

References

 
Beetle families